Ilychytis is a genus of moths of the family Yponomeutidae.

Species
Ilychytis anaemopa - Meyrick, 1937 

Yponomeutidae